Versal is an English-language literary journal that publishes poetry, prose and art. It was founded in 2002 by American poet Megan M. Garr (editor) and is published by wordsinhere, a literary organization in Amsterdam, Netherlands. In 2009, Poets & Writers magazine listed Versal as One of '22 lit mags that do more for your work.'

Versal publishes both new and established writers from around the world, including Argentina, Uruguay, Morocco, Romania, the United Kingdom, Germany, China, South Africa, the Czech Republic, the Netherlands, Croatia, Hungary, the United States, Canada, France and Australia. Its editor Megan M. Garr has, in the Versal 7 and 8 editorials, on the Versal blog and in an interview, discussed the connections between Versal and translocality. Garr was also a panelist at the 2011 Prague Microfestival of Literature at which translocality was a central theme. The text of Garr's presentation during the panel can be found on Versal's blog.

Versal is archived at the National Library of the Netherlands, ISSN is 1573-2207.

Staff 
Editor: Megan M. Garr
Managing editor: Sarah Ream
Poetry editor: Megan M. Garr
Fiction editor: Robert Glick
Art editor: Shayna Schapp

Assistant editors:
Jennifer Arcuni
Anna Arov
Reed van Brunschot
Daniel J. Cecil
Jennifer K. Dick
Kate Foley
BJ Hollars
Terri Hron
Kai Lashley
Bonnie J. Rough
Dafna Ruppin
Matthew Sadler
Mirabai Lacazette de Monchy
Hélène Webers

Contributors 

The journal's notable contributors include:

"Versal" 10

Renee Couture 
Ruth Danon 
Tamar de Kemp 
Neil de la Flor 
Laura Eve Engel 
Roxane Gay 
Luke Andrew Geddes 
James Grinwis 
Shannon Elizabeth Hardwick 
Susan van Hengstum 
Geoff J. Kim 
Ish Klein 
Laurence Levy 
Philip Lüschen 
J. Annie MacLeod 
Julia Madsen 
Dora Malech 
Ben Merriman 
Rusty Morrison 
Bill Neumire 
Lisa Annelouise Rentz 
Andrew Michael Roberts 
Kayla Romberger 
Brandon Shimoda 
Candy Shue 
Lee Sittler 
Kristine Snodgrass 
Joe Sobel 
Freddy Tuppen 
Siobhan Wall 
Judith Westerveld 
Bess Winter 
Amy Wright 
Jessica Young 
Victor Zwiers 

Versal 9

Louis Armand and Alice Notley
Stace Budzko    
Heather Hartley
Rochelle Hurt 
Stacy Kidd  
Jane Lewty   
Nate Liederbach  
Antoinette Nausikaä 
Maya Sarishvili  
Amy Touchette  
Ken White  

Versal 8

Carlos Barbarito (trans by Laura Chalar)  
Chung Ho-seung (trans by Mia You)    
Neil de la Flor  
Michael Genovese   
Kim Holleman  
Kuzhali Manickavel  
Kerri Rosenstein 
Selah Saterstrom 
Brandon Shimoda  
Kristine Snodgrass  

Versal 7

Agustina Bazterrica
Emily Carr
Joel Fishbane
Albane Gellé (trans by Jennifer K. Dick)
Elizabeth Gross
Desmond Kon Zhicheng-Mingdé
Mary Miller
Trey Moody
Sawako Nakayasu
Rufo Quintavalle
Peter Shippy
Nicole Walker

Versal 6

Wiljan van den Akker
Marosa di Giorgio
Ben Doller
Emmanuel Moses (trans by Marilyn Hacker)
Takashi Hiraide (trans by Sawako Nakayasu)
Sándor Kányádi
Xiao Kaiyu (trans by Alistair Noon)
Selfa Chew
Alex Piperno
Jennifer Arcuni

Versal 5

Vesna Biga
Tsead Bruinja
Myronn Hardy
Theodore Worozbyt
Kelly Zen-Yie Tsia
Joseph Radke
Julie Marie Wade
Andrew Michael Roberts
Josh Hockensmith
Alissa Nutting
Billy O’Callaghan
Mary Buchinger

Versal 4

Helen Degen Cohen 
Robert Glick 
Tatjana Lukic 
Alex Piperno 
Claire Potter
Mark Terrill
Aleida Rodriguez

Versal 3

Marilyn Hacker
Naomi Shihab Nye
Julie Doxsee
Barbara Jane Reyes
Joanna Klink
Sandy Florian

Versal 2

L. Ward Abel
Kate Foley
Noah Eli Gordon
Rob McLennan
Michael Rothenberg
Larry Sawyer
Joshua Marie Wilkinson
Sonia Zagwyn

Reviews
 Reviews of Versal issues at NewPages
 Review of Versal 8 at Tarpaulin Sky
 'A Home for Experimental Prose'
 Luna Park review of Versal 7

Recognition
 Featured in the Sept/Oct 2005 edition of Poets & Writers Magazine 
 Listed as one of the '22 Lit Mags That Do More For Your Work' in Poets & Writers
 'Best Literary Magazine' of Amsterdam (TimeOut, October, 2009)
 'Indie Innovator' listed by Poets & Writers
 Excerpt from Versal 8 featured on Luna Park Review

References

Further reading

 Official website

 Official blog

2002 establishments in the Netherlands
English-language magazines
Literary magazines published in the Netherlands
Literary translation magazines
Magazines established in 2002
Magazines published in Amsterdam